Nakapiripirit District  is a district in Northern Uganda. Like many other Ugandan districts, it is named after its 'chief town', Nakapiripirit, where the district headquarters are located.

Location
The district is bordered by Napak District to the north, Moroto District to the northeast, Amudat District to the east, Kween District to the southeast, Bulambuli District to the southwest, Kumi District to the west and Katakwi District to the northwest. The coordinates of the district are:01 55N, 34 40E.

Population
The 1991 national population census estimated the district population at about 66,250. In 2002, the national census conducted that year estimated the population of the district at about 90,920. Between 2002 and 2012, it is estimated that the district population has been growing at an annual rate of 6%. In view of those data, it is estimated that in 2012 the population of Nakapiripirit District was about 161,600.

Ethnicities
The majority of the population are Karamojong and the language spoken is the Karamojong language.

Economic activity
The main activity in the district is animal husbandry and the majority of the population are pastoralists. However in some areas, especially in the south, some agricultural activity takes place. More recently the exploration of the rich mineral landscape has begun in earnest by American, Canadian, Middle Eastern and Indian prospectors.

See also

References

External links
 The Place to Relax In Nakapiripirit

 
Districts of Uganda
Northern Region, Uganda
Karamoja